Robert G. Lindsay (October 28, 1894 - May 1972) was an American Democratic Party politician from the New York City borough of Staten Island. He represented that borough in the New York City Council from 1964–1972.

References

1894 births
1972 deaths
New York City Council members
New York (state) Democrats
Politicians from Staten Island
20th-century American politicians